is a Buddhist temple located in the city of Kisarazu in Chiba Prefecture, Japan. The temple is also known as the "Takazō Kannon". It is the 30th temple in the Bandō Sanjūsankasho, the circuit of 33 Buddhist temples in Eastern Japan sacred to the Bodhisattva Kannon. Amulets issued by the temple are highly valued throughout Japan.

History 
According to legend, Kōzō-ji was founded in the Asuka period during the brief period of the Emperor Yōmei, father of Prince Shōtoku, and a vocal supporter of Buddhism. Later, the priest Gyōki built and dedicated the temple to the Bodhisattava Kannon after having seen the Kannon in a vision. The area around the temple is associated with the mother of Fujiwara no Kamatari (614 – 669), a statesman, courtier and politician of the Nara period. Kamatari's mother despaired of giving birth to a son, but was told in a vision at this temple that she should visit the Kashima Shrine, after which she gave birth to Fujiwara no Kamatari.

Hondō main hall 
The Hondō (main hall) of Kōzō-ji is a multi-story structure. It features an 'irimoya' roof typical of Buddhist architecture the 6th century with a hip roof that slopes down on all four sides and integrates on two opposing sides with a gable. The Hondō was probably constructed in 1526.

Kannon statue 
The Hondō features an unusual raised-floor construction. The Kannon statue was formerly hidden from view, but now sits on the raised floor and can be viewed by parishioners of the temple and by the general public.

Structures 
The three major structures of Kozo-ji are designated as Kisazaru City important cultural properties. They are the:

Sanmon—Temple gate
Hondō—Main hall
Shōrō—Bell tower

Observances 
February 2 -- Setsubun observance of the beginning of spring
March -- Vernal Equinox Higan service
August 18—Kannon Festival
August 24 -- Segakie, a memorial service
September -- Autumnal Equinox Higan service
December -- 'Joya no Kane', ringing of the temple bell 108 times for the New Year

Order in Buddhist pilgrimages 
 Bandō Sanjūsankasho
29 Chiba-dera　--　30 Kōzō-ji 　--　31 Kasamori-ji

Transportation 
Kōzō-ji is in the Yano District of Kisarazu, which is one hour by bus from Kisarazu Station on the JR East Uchibō Line and Kururi Line.

References

External links
Official home page

Religious organizations established in the 6th century
Buddhist temples in Chiba Prefecture
6th-century establishments in Japan
Kisarazu